The Beysug is a river in Krasnodar Krai of Russia. It flows into the Sea of Azov through the Beysugsky Liman.

References

Rivers of Krasnodar Krai
Drainage basins of the Sea of Azov